Rokewood Junction  is a locality in Victoria, Australia in the Golden Plains Shire,  west of the state capital, Melbourne.

References

Towns in Victoria (Australia)
Golden Plains Shire